The Associated Press (AP) is an American not-for-profit news agency headquartered in New York City. Founded in 1846, it operates as a cooperative, unincorporated association, and produces news reports that are distributed to its members, U.S. newspapers and broadcasters. Since the award was established in 1917, the AP has earned 56 Pulitzer Prizes, including 34 for photography. It is also known for publishing the widely used AP Stylebook.

By 2016, news collected by the AP was published and republished by more than 1,300 newspapers and broadcasters, English, Spanish, and Arabic. The AP operates 248 news bureaus in 99 countries. It also operates the AP Radio Network, which provides newscasts twice hourly for broadcast and satellite radio and television stations. Many newspapers and broadcasters outside the United States are AP subscribers, paying a fee to use AP material without being contributing members of the cooperative. As part of their cooperative agreement with the AP, most member news organizations grant automatic permission for the AP to distribute their local news reports. The AP traditionally employed the "inverted pyramid" formula for writing, a method that enables news outlets to edit a story to fit its available publication area without losing the story's essentials, although in 2007, then-AP President Tom Curley called the practice "dead".

History

The Associated Press was formed in May 1846 by five daily newspapers in New York City to share the cost of transmitting news of the Mexican–American War. The venture was organized by Moses Yale Beach (1800–68), second publisher of The Sun, joined by the New York Herald, the New York Courier and Enquirer, The Journal of Commerce, and the New York Evening Express. Some historians believe that the New-York Tribune joined at this time; documents show it was a member in 1849. The New York Times became a member in September 1851.

Initially known as the New York Associated Press (NYAP), the organization faced competition from the Western Associated Press (1862), which criticized its monopolistic news gathering and price setting practices. An investigation completed in 1892 by Victor Lawson, editor and publisher of the Chicago Daily News, revealed that several principals of the NYAP had entered into a secret agreement with United Press, a rival organization, to share NYAP news and the profits of reselling it. The revelations led to the demise of the NYAP and in December 1892, the Western Associated Press was incorporated in Illinois as the Associated Press. A 1900 Illinois Supreme Court decision (Inter Ocean Publishing Co. v. Associated Press) that the AP was a public utility and operating in restraint of trade resulted in the AP's move from Chicago to New York City, where corporation laws were more favorable to cooperatives.

Melville Stone, who had founded the Chicago Daily News in 1875, served as AP general manager from 1893 to 1921. The cooperative grew rapidly under the leadership of Kent Cooper, who served from 1925 to 1948 and who built up bureau staff in South America, Europe and (after World War II), the Middle East. He introduced the "telegraph typewriter" or teletypewriter into newsrooms in 1914. In 1935, the AP launched the Wirephoto network, which allowed transmission of news photographs over leased private telephone lines on the day they were taken. This gave the AP a major advantage over other news media outlets. While the first network was only between New York, Chicago, and San Francisco, eventually the AP had its network across the whole United States.

In 1945, the Supreme Court of the United States held in Associated Press v. United States that the AP had been violating the Sherman Antitrust Act by prohibiting member newspapers from selling or providing news to nonmember organizations as well as making it very difficult for nonmember newspapers to join the AP. The decision facilitated the growth of its main rival United Press International, headed by Hugh Baillie from 1935 to 1955.

The AP entered the broadcast field in 1941 when it began distributing news to radio stations; it created its own radio network in 1974. In 1994, it established APTV, a global video newsgathering agency. APTV merged with WorldWide Television News in 1998 to form APTN, which provides video to international broadcasters and websites. In 2004, the AP moved its headquarters from its long time home at 50 Rockefeller Plaza to 450 West 33rd Street in Manhattan. In 2019, AP had more than 240 bureaus globally. Its mission—"to gather with economy and efficiency an accurate and impartial report of the news"—has not changed since its founding, but digital technology has made the distribution of the AP news report an interactive endeavor between the AP and its 1,400 U.S. newspaper members as well as broadcasters, international subscribers, and online customers.

The AP began diversifying its news gathering capabilities and by 2007 the AP was generating only about 30% of its revenue from United States newspapers. 37% came from the global broadcast customers, 15% from online ventures and 18% came from international newspapers and from photography.

Web resources
The AP's multi-topic structure has resulted in web portals such as Yahoo! and MSN posting its articles, often relying on the AP as their first source for news coverage of breaking news items. This and the constant updating evolving stories require has had a major impact on the AP's public image and role, giving new credence to the AP's ongoing mission of having staff for covering every area of news fully and promptly. In 2007, Google announced that it was paying to receive AP content, to be displayed in Google News, interrupted from late 2009 to mid-2010 due to a licensing dispute.

A 2017 study by NewsWhip revealed that AP content was more engaged with on Facebook than content from any individual English-language publisher.

Timeline
 1849: The Harbor News Association opened the first news bureau outside the United States in Halifax, Nova Scotia, to meet ships sailing from Europe before they reached dock in New York.
 1876: Mark Kellogg, a stringer, was the first AP news correspondent to be killed while reporting the news, at the Battle of the Little Bighorn.
 1893: Melville E. Stone became the general manager of the reorganized the AP, a post he held until 1921. Under his leadership, the AP grew to be one of the world's most prominent news agencies.
 1899: The AP used Guglielmo Marconi's wireless telegraph to cover the America's Cup yacht race off Sandy Hook, New Jersey, the first news test of the new technology.
 1914: The AP introduced the teleprinter, which transmitted directly to printers over telegraph wires. Eventually a worldwide network of 60-word-per-minute teleprinter machines is built.
 1935: The AP initiated WirePhoto, the world's first wire service for photographs. The first photograph to transfer over the network depicted an airplane crash in Morehouse, New York, on New Year's Day, 1935.
 1938: The AP expanded new offices at 50 Rockefeller Plaza (known as "50 Rock") under an agreement made as part of the construction of Rockefeller Center in New York City. The building would remain its headquarters for 66 years.
 1941: The AP expanded from print to radio broadcast news.
 1941: Wide World News Photo Service purchased from The New York Times.
1943: The AP sends Ruth Cowan Nash to cover the deployment of the Women's Army Auxiliary Corps to Algeria. Nash is the first American woman war correspondent.
 1945: AP war correspondent Joseph Morton was executed along with nine OSS men and four British SOE agents by the Germans at Mauthausen concentration camp. Morton was the only Allied correspondent to be executed by the Axis during World War II. That same year, AP Paris bureau chief Edward Kennedy defied an Allied headquarters news blackout to report Nazi Germany's surrender, touching off a bitter episode that lead to his eventual dismissal by the AP. Kennedy maintains that he reported only what German radio already had broadcast.
 1951: AP war correspondent Prague bureau chief William N. Oatis was arrested for espionage by the Communist government of Czechoslovakia. He was not released until 1953.
 1974: The AP launches the Associated Press Radio Network headquartered in Washington, D.C.
 1994: The AP launches APTV, a global video news gathering agency, headquartered in London.
 2004: The AP moves its headquarters from 50 Rock to 450 West 33rd Street, New York City.
 2006: The AP joins YouTube.
 2008: The AP launched AP Mobile (initially known as the AP Mobile News Network), a multimedia news portal that gives users news they can choose and provides anytime access to international, national and local news. The AP was the first to debut a dedicated iPhone application in June 2008 on stage at Apple's WWDC event. The app offered AP's own worldwide coverage of breaking news, sports, entertainment, politics and business as well as content from more than 1,000 AP members and third-party sources.
2008: The AP opens its Pyongyang bureau.
 2010: The AP launched multi-device World Cup Soccer Applications providing real-time news coverage of the 2010 World Cup on desktop, Apple and Android devices.
 2010: AP earnings fall 65% from 2008 to just $8.8million. The AP also announced that it would have posted a loss of $4.4million had it not liquidated its German-language news service for $13.2million.
 2011: AP revenue dropped $14.7million in 2010. 2010 revenue totaled $631million, a decline of 7% from the previous year. The AP rolled out price cuts designed to help newspapers and broadcasters cope with declining revenue.
 2012: Gary B. Pruitt succeeded Tom Curley to become president and CEO. Pruitt is the 13th leader of the AP in its 166-year history.
 2016: The AP Reports that income dropped to $1.6million from $183.6million in 2015. The 2015 profit figure was bolstered by a one-time, $165million tax benefit.
 2017: The AP moved its headquarters to 200 Liberty Street, New York City.
 2018: The AP unveiled AP Votecast to replace exit polls for the 2018 US midterm elections.

Governance
The AP is governed by an elected board of directors. Since April 2017, the chairman is Steven Swartz, president and CEO of Hearst Communications.

Election polls

The AP is the only organization that collects and verifies election results in every city and county across the United States, including races for the U.S. president, the Senate and House of Representatives, governor as well as other statewide offices. Major news outlets rely on the polling data and results provided by the Associated Press before declaring a winner in major political races, particularly the presidential election. In declaring the winners, the AP has historically relied on a robust network of local reporters with first-hand knowledge of assigned territories who also have long-standing relationships with county clerks as well as other local officials. Moreover, the AP monitors and gathers data from county websites and electronic feeds provided by states. The research team further verifies the results by considering demographics, number of absentee ballots, and other political issues that may have an effect on the final results. In 2018, the AP has introduced a new system called AP VoteCast, which was developed together with NORC at the University of Chicago in order to further improve the reliability of its data and overcome biases of its legacy exit poll.

Recognized for its integrity and accuracy, the organization has collected and published presidential election data since 1848. During the 2016 election, the AP was 100% accurate in calling the president and congressional races in every state.

Sports polls

The AP conducts polls for numerous college sports in the United States. The AP college football rankings were created in 1936, and began including the top 25 teams in 1989. Since 1969, the final poll of each season has been released after all bowl games have been played. The AP released its all-time Top 25 in 2016. , 22 different programs had finished in the number one spot of the poll since its inception. In the pre-bowl game determination era, the AP poll was often used as the distinction for a national champion in football.

The AP college basketball poll has been used as a guide for which teams deserve national attention. The AP first began its poll of college basketball teams in 1949, and has since conducted over 1,100 polls. The college basketball poll started with 20 teams and was reduced to 10 during the 1960-61 college basketball season. It returned to 20 teams in 1968-69 and expanded to 25 beginning in 1989–90. The final poll for each season is released prior to the conclusion of the NCAA tournament, so all data includes regular season games only. In 2017, The AP released a list of the Top 100 teams of all time. The poll counted poll appearances (one point) and No. 1 rankings (two points) to rank each team.

Sports awards

Baseball
The AP began its Major League Baseball Manager of the Year Award in 1959, for a manager in each league. From 1984 to 2000, the award was given to one manager in all of MLB. The winners were chosen by a national panel of AP baseball writers and radio men. The award was discontinued in 2001.

Basketball
Every year, the AP releases the names of the winners of its AP College Basketball Player of the Year and AP College Basketball Coach of the Year awards. It also honors a group of All-American players.

Football
 AP NFL Coach of the Year
 AP NFL Most Valuable Player
 AP NFL Offensive Player of the Year
 AP NFL Defensive Player of the Year
 AP NFL Rookie of the Year
 AP NFL Comeback Player of the Year

Associated Press Television News

In 1994, London-based Associated Press Television (APTV) was founded to provide agency news material to television broadcasters. In 1998, the AP purchased Worldwide Television News (WTN) from the ABC News division of The Walt Disney Company, Nine Network Australia and ITN London. The AP publishes 70,000 videos and 6,000 hours of live video per year, . The agency also provides five simultaneous live video channels, AP Direct via satellite for broadcasters, and four live channels on AP Live Choice for digital publishers. The AP was the first news agency to launch a live video news service in 2003.

AP Stylebook

Litigation and controversies

Kidnapping of Tina Susman
In 1994, Tina Susman was on her fourth trip to Somalia, reporting for the AP. She was reporting on U.S. peacekeeping troops leaving the country. Somali rebels outnumbered her bodyguards in Mogadishu, dragged her from her car in broad daylight, and held her for 20 days. She told The Quill that she believes being a woman was an advantage in her experience there. The AP had requested news organizations including The New York Times, the Chicago Tribune, and The Washington Post to suppress the story to discourage the emboldening of the kidnappers.

Christopher Newton
In September 2002, Washington, D.C. bureau reporter Christopher Newton, an AP reporter since 1994, was fired after he was accused of fabricating sources since 2000, including at least 40 people and organizations. Prior to his firing, Newton had been focused on writing about federal law-enforcement while based at the Justice Department. Some of the nonexistent agencies quoted in his stories included "Education Alliance", the "Institute for Crime and Punishment in Chicago", "Voice for the Disabled", and "People for Civil Rights".

FBI impersonation case
In 2007, an FBI agent working in Seattle impersonated an AP journalist and infected the computer of a 15-year old suspect with a malicious surveillance software. The incident sparked a strongly worded statement from the AP demanding the bureau never impersonate a member of the news media again. In September 2016 the incident resulted in a report by the Justice Department, which the AP said "effectively condone[d] the FBI's impersonation".

In December 2017, following a US court appearance, a judge ruled in favor of the AP in a lawsuit against the FBI for fraudulently impersonating a member of the news media.

Fair-use controversy
In June 2008, the AP sent numerous DMCA take down demands and threatened legal action against several blogs. The AP contended that the internet blogs were violating the AP's copyright by linking to AP material and using headlines and short summaries in those links. Many bloggers and experts noted that the use of the AP news fell squarely under commonly accepted internet practices and within fair-use standards. Others noted and demonstrated that the AP routinely takes similar excerpts from other sources, often without attribution or licenses. The AP responded that it was defining standards regarding citations of AP news.

Shepard Fairey
In March 2009, the AP counter-sued artist Shepard Fairey over his famous image of Barack Obama, saying the uncredited, uncompensated use of an AP photo violated copyright laws and signaled a threat to journalism. Fairey had sued the AP the previous month over his artwork, titled "Obama Hope" and "Obama Progress", arguing that he did not violate copyright law because he dramatically changed the image. The artwork, based on an April 2006 picture taken for the AP by Mannie Garcia, was a popular image during the 2008 presidential election and now hangs in the National Portrait Gallery in Washington, D.C. According to the AP lawsuit filed in federal court in Manhattan, Fairey knowingly "misappropriated The AP's rights in that image". The suit asked the court to award the AP profits made off the image and damages. Fairey said he looked forward to "upholding the free expression rights at stake here" and disproving the AP's accusations. In January 2011 this suit was settled with neither side declaring their position to be wrong but agreeing to share reproduction rights and profits from Fairey's work.

Hot News
In January 2008, the AP sued competitor All Headline News (AHN) claiming that AHN allegedly infringed on its copyrights and a contentious "quasi-property" right to facts. The AP complaint asserted that AHN reporters had copied facts from AP news reports without permission and without paying a syndication fee. After AHN moved to dismiss all but the copyright claims set forth by the AP, a majority of the lawsuit was dismissed. The case has been dismissed and both parties settled.

Hoax tweet and flash crash
On April 23, 2013, the AP's Twitter account was hacked to release a hoax tweet about fictional attacks in the White House that left President Obama injured.

Justice Department subpoena of phone records

On May 13, 2013, the AP announced telephone records for 20 of their reporters during a two-month period in 2012, had been subpoenaed by the U.S. Justice Department and described these acts as a "massive and unprecedented intrusion" into news-gathering operations. The AP reported that the Justice Department would not say why it sought the records, but sources stated that the United States Attorney for the District of Columbia's office was conducting a criminal investigation into a May 7, 2012 AP story about a CIA operation that prevented a terrorist plot to detonate an explosive device on a commercial flight. The DOJ did not direct subpoenas to the AP, instead going to their phone providers, including Verizon Wireless. U.S. Attorney General Eric Holder testified under oath in front of the House Judiciary Committee that he recused himself from the leak investigations to avoid any appearance of a conflict of interest. Holder said his Deputy Attorney General, James M. Cole, was in charge of the AP investigation and would have ordered the subpoenas.

AP deal with Nazi Germany
The AP gave the Nazi regime access to its photo archives for its antisemitic propaganda. AP also cooperated with the Nazi regime through censorship.

Investigators (chiefly Norman Domeier of the University of Vienna) have in recent years brought to wider attention the deal between the AP and the German government related to the interchange of press photos during the period in which the United States was at war with Germany. This relationship involved the Bureau Laux, run by the photographer Helmut Laux.

The mechanism for this interchange was that a courier flew to Lisbon and back each day transporting photos from and for Germany's wartime enemy, the US, via diplomatic pouch. The transactions were initially conducted at the AP bureau under Luiz Lupi in Lisbon, and from 1944, when the exchange via Lisbon took too long, also at the AP bureau in Stockholm under Eddie Shanke. Here, as a cover, the Swedish agency, was involved as an intermediary. An estimated 40,000 photos were exchanged between the enemies in this way.

The AP in 2017 published an extensive report of its dealings with Germany before and during World War II. The AP conducted an in-depth review of its operations in Nazi Germany, concluding that the news agency acted as "forthrightly and independently as possible." The review also found that the AP handled some situations inadequately.

The AP review was undertaken following an article that claimed the AP allowed Nazi propagandists to exert some influence over its news photo report in the 1930s by maintaining a photo subsidiary in Germany, registered under a restrictive Nazi press law. The AP's review disputed the claim that the news agency was in any way complicit with the Nazi regime during the years 1933–41, when the agency was present in the country. The AP was kicked out of Germany when the United States entered World War II in December 1941.

"We recognize that AP should have done some things differently during this period, for example protesting when AP photos were exploited by the Nazis for propaganda within Germany and refusing to employ German photographers with active political affiliations and loyalties," the report said." However, suggestions that the AP at any point sought to help the Nazis or their heinous cause are simply wrong."

Israeli–Palestinian conflict
In his book Broken Spring: An American-Israeli Reporter's Close-up View of How Egyptians Lost Their Struggle for Freedom, former AP correspondent Mark Lavie claimed that the editorial line of the Cairo bureau was that the conflict was Israel's fault and the Arabs and Palestinians were blameless. Israeli journalist Matti Friedman accused the AP of killing a story he wrote about the "war of words", "between Israel and its critics in human rights organizations", in the aftermath of the Israel/Gaza conflict of 2008–09.

Tuvia Grossman photograph 
On September 29, 2000, the first day of the Second Intifada, the AP sent out of a photograph of a badly bloodied young man behind whom a police officer could be seen with a baton raised in a menacing fashion; a gas station with Hebrew lettering could also be seen in the background. The AP labelled it with the caption "An Israeli policeman and a Palestinian on the Temple Mount", and the picture and caption were subsequently published in several major American newspapers, including the New York Times and the Boston Globe. In reality, the injured man in the photograph was a Jewish yeshiva student from Chicago named Tuvia Grossman, and the police officer, a Druze named Gidon Tzefadi, was protecting Grossman from a Palestinian mob who had clubbed, stoned, and stabbed Grossman. There are also no gas stations with Hebrew lettering on the Temple Mount.

The episode is often cited by those who accuse the media of having an anti-Israel bias, and was the impetus for the founding of HonestReporting. After a letter from Grossman's father noted the error, the AP, the New York Times, and other papers published corrections; despite these corrections, the photograph continues to be used by critics of Israel as a symbol of Israeli aggression and violence.

Israeli airstrike on the AP office building 
During the 2021 Israel–Palestine crisis, the Israeli army destroyed the al-Jalaa Highrise, a building housing the AP's Gaza offices and Al Jazeera offices. Israel stated that the building housed Hamas military intelligence and had given advanced warning of the strike, and no civilians were harmed. AP CEO Gary Pruitt released a statement on May 16, stating that he "had no indication Hamas was in the building" and called on the Israeli government to provide the evidence. He said that "the world will know less about what is happening in Gaza because of what happened today."

On 17 May, US secretary of state Antony Blinken said he had not seen any evidence that Hamas operated from the building housing the AP and Al Jazeera, but it is the job of others to handle intelligence matters. Israel reportedly shared intelligence with American officials and U.S. president Joe Biden showing Hamas offices inside the building. Journalist Matti Friedman also supported the Israeli government's claim.

Reporters Without Borders asked the International Criminal Court to investigate the bombing as a possible war crime.

On June 8, Israeli Ambassador to the US Gilad Erdan met with AP CEO Gary Pruitt and vice president for foreign news, Ian Phillips, to discuss the operation. In coordination with the IDF, Erdan said the site was used by Hamas intelligence officials to develop and carry out SIGINT and electronic warfare operations, targeting both IDF and civilian systems in Israel, including devices to disrupt the Iron Dome. Erdan also said the Israeli government does not believe the AP was aware of the Hamas presence because it was a secret unit. He said the Israeli government was willing to help rebuild the AP's offices and ensure they will be able to bring equipment into Gaza.

Firing of Emily Wilder 
In May 2021, the AP said it would launch a review of its social media policies after questions were raised about the firing of a journalist who expressed pro-Palestinian views on social media. The announcement came after some AP journalists signed a letter expressing concern over the termination of former news associate Emily Wilder, whom the AP said committed multiple violations of the company's social media policy.  Wilder was the target of a right-wing online harassment campaign for her activism while at Stanford University. The AP has said that Wilder's previous activism played no role in her termination.

Migrant Boat NFT 
On January 10, 2022, AP announced it would start selling non-fungible tokens (NFTs) of their photographs in partnership with a company named Xooa, with the proceeds being used to fund their operations. One of the NFTs they promoted on Twitter on 24 February was an aerial shot depicting an overcrowded migrant boat in the Mediterranean Sea. The tweet received negative backlash from users and other journalists, with AP being accused of profiting off of human suffering and the picture choice being "dystopian" and "in extremely poor taste". The tweet was subsequently deleted and the NFT, which was to be sold the next day, was pulled from market. Global director of media relations Lauren Easton apologized, saying "This was a poor choice of imagery for an NFT. It has not and will not be put up for auction [...] AP's NFT marketplace is a very early pilot program, and we are immediately reviewing our efforts".

Awards received
The AP has earned 56 Pulitzer Prizes, including 34 for photography, since the award was established in 1917. In May 2020, Dar Yasin, Mukhtar Khan, and Channi Anand of the AP were honored with the 2020 Pulitzer Prize for Feature Photography. The choice caused controversy, because it was taken by some as questioning "India's legitimacy over Kashmir" as it had used the word "independence" in regard to revocation of Article 370.<ref>{{cite web|url=https://www.outlookindia.com/newsscroll/pulitzer-prize-questions-indias-legitimacy-over-kashmir-ld/1824441|title=Pulitzer Prize questions Indias legitimacy over Kashmir (Ld)|date=5 May 2020|magazine=Outlook|access-date=May 6, 2020|via=(IANS)}}</ref>

See also

 Agence France-Presse
 Associated Press v. Meltwater''
 Australian Associated Press
 The Canadian Press
 EFE
 George Emil Bria
 International Press Telecommunications Council
 List of news agencies
 List of online image archives
 NewsML
 News Industry Text Format
 Reuters
 TweenTribune

References

Citations

Sources

External links 

 
 

 
1846 establishments in New York (state)
Sports mass media in the United States
Cooperatives in the United States
News agencies based in the United States
Non-profit organizations based in New York City
Photo archives in the United States
Publications established in 1846
College football awards organizations
Pulitzer Prize for Public Service winners
Fact-checking websites
Photo agencies
Pulitzer Prize for Feature Photography winners
Multinational companies headquartered in the United States